Microtheca ochroloma, the yellow-margined leaf beetle, is a species of leaf beetle in the family Chrysomelidae. It is found in North America and South America.

References

Further reading

External links

 

Chrysomelinae
Articles created by Qbugbot
Beetles described in 1860